Wayne Pinnock (born 24 October 2000) is a Jamaican athlete who competes in the long jump.

Pinnock finished ninth in the 2022 World Athletics Championships – Men's long jump on his major championship debut. Prior to this, Pinnock won the long jump at the 2022 NCAA Division I Outdoor Track and Field Championships to complete the double having previously also won the 2022 NCAA Division I Indoor Track and Field Championships.

References

2000 births
Living people
Jamaican male long jumpers
World Athletics Championships athletes for Jamaica
21st-century Jamaican people